Pseudanthus pimeleoides is small shrub in the family Picrodendraceae (formerly Euphorbiaceae) found in the greater Sydney region. However, there are a few records from the upper Hunter Valley.

References

Flora of New South Wales
pimeleoides
Plants described in 1827